Mozelle may refer to:

Mozelle, Kentucky, an unincorporated community in Leslie County
Mozelle, West Virginia, an unincorporated community in Jackson County

See also
Moselle (disambiguation)